Ravenscliffe may refer to:

Places
 Ravenscliffe, Ontario, Canada
 Ravenscliffe (ward), in the Borough of Newcastle-under-Lyme, Staffordshire, England
 Ravenscliffe, West Yorkshire, in the Eccleshill ward of the city of Bradford, West Yorkshire, England

Other
Ravenscliffe, a novel of 1851 by Anne Marsh-Caldwell